

Crave or Craving may refer to:

Entertainment and media

Companies and services 
 Crave (streaming service), a Canadian video-on-demand streaming service
 Crave (TV network), a Canadian linear pay TV service operated in conjunction with the above streaming service
 Crave Records, a defunct record label
 Crave Entertainment, a defunct video game developer
 Mandatory (company) (previously CraveOnline), a men's-oriented website

Music 
 Crave (band), an R&B musical group
 Crave (For King & Country album), 2012
 Crave (Cyclefly album), 2002
 The Crave, an album by Stephen Dale Petit, 2010
 "Crave" (Madonna and Swae Lee song), 2019
 "Crave" (Years & Years song), 2021
 Crave (Kiesza album), the second studio album by Kiesza, (2020)
 Craving (album), a 1999 album by Fayray

Other media 
 Crave (play), a 1998 play by Sarah Kane
 Crave (film), a 2012 film

Other uses
 Food craving, a desire to consume a specific food
 Craving (withdrawal), a psychological withdrawal symptom
 Jaimee Foxworth (born 1979), stage name Crave, American actress and model

See also
 The Craving (disambiguation)
 Taṇhā, a concept in Buddhism that deals with cravings